Saudi Arabia participated in the 2009 Asian Indoor Games in Hanoi, Vietnam on 30 October – 8 November 2009.

Medals

Archery

Athletics

3-on-3 Basketball

Billiards

Bowling

Swimming

References

Saudi Arabia at the Asian Games
Nations at the 2009 Asian Indoor Games
2009 in Saudi Arabian sport